Benjamin Connor or Benjamin Conner was Locomotive Superintendent of the Caledonian Railway from 1856 to 1876. He was born in Glasgow in 1813 and died there on 3 February 1876. Connor married Helen Dick and had five children: James (born 1854), Cristina (born 1858), Alexander (born 1860), Benjamin (born 1864) and William (born 1867).

Design
The Railway Gazette described Connor as a "very celebrated engineer" because of his 1839 design of the passenger locomotive which was an enlargement on the locomotives available at the time. A locomotive built from his drawings was exhibited at the 1862 London International Exhibition.

Career
Connor was apprenticed to James Gray of Glasgow. Later he worked for Murdoch, Aitken & Co, Glasgow, where he learned locomotive engineering. He moved to England, working in Liverpool and Manchester, and then returned to Scotland to work for W.M. Neilson. After this he worked for Robert Napier and Sons and learned marine engineering. He was appointed locomotive superintendent of the Caledonian Railway in 1856.

Locomotives

References

Sources
 Ian Allan ABC of British Railways Locomotives, January 1961, page 58

British railway pioneers
Locomotive superintendents
Scottish railway mechanical engineers
19th-century Scottish people
Caledonian Railway people
1813 births
1876 deaths
19th-century British businesspeople